Let's Do It Again may refer to:

 Let's Do It Again (1953 film), a film directed by Alexander Hall, starring Jane Wyman and Ray Milland
 Let's Do It Again (1975 film), a film directed by Sidney Poitier, starring Poitier and Bill Cosby
 Let's Do It Again (soundtrack), a soundtrack album from the 1975 film
 "Let's Do It Again" (song), a song by The Staple Singers from the film and album
 Let's Do It Again (Camp Lo album)
 Let's Do It Again (Leela James album)
 "Let's Do It Again", a song by J Boog from Backyard Boogie
 "Let's Do It Again", a song by TLC from CrazySexyCool

See also
 Let's Do It (disambiguation)